The 2012–13 Samoa National League was the 23rd edition of the Samoa National League, the top league of the Football Federation Samoa. This season was won by Lupe o le Soaga for the first recorded time.

Standings

References

Samoa National League seasons
Samoa
football
Samoa
football